Travedona-Biandronno railway station is a railway station in the comune of Travedona-Monate, in the Italian region of Lombardy. It is an intermediate stop on the standard gauge Luino–Milan line of Rete Ferroviaria Italiana.

Services 
 the following services stop at Travedona-Biandronno:

References

External links 
 
 Travedona-Biandronno – RFI

Buildings and structures in the Province of Varese
Railway stations in Lombardy